The Trail of Broken Treaties (also known as the Trail of Broken Treaties Caravan and the Pan American Native Quest for Justice) was a 1972 cross-country caravan of American Indian and First Nations organizations that started on the West Coast of the United States and ended at the Department of Interior headquarters building at the US capital of Washington DC. Participants called for the restoration of tribes’ treaty-making authority, the abolition of the Bureau of Indian Affairs, and federal investment in jobs, housing, and education.

The protest inspired sizable gatherings of Native Americans throughout the journey, with the caravan described as "over four miles long and included some 700 activists from more than 200 tribes and 25 states" when it departed St Paul, Minnesota for Washington D.C.

The eight organizations that sponsored the caravan included the American Indian Movement, the Canadian Assembly of First Nations (formerly the National Indian Brotherhood), the Native American Rights Fund, the National Indian Youth Council, the National American Indian Council, the National Council on Indian Work, National Indian Leadership Training, and the American Indian Committee on Alcohol and Drug Abuse. In Minneapolis, American Indian Movement (AIM) headquarters, activists developed a Twenty-Point Position paper to define their demands.

History 
The 1960s were a period of increasing activism by American Indians (and First Nations in Canada) as they worked to renew civil rights and improve relations with federal governments that had repeatedly failed to satisfy treaty obligations. By this time numerous American Indians were living in urban settings, encouraged to relocate from reservations by the federal government in an effort to find more work opportunities, but often isolated by discrimination, poor educations in public schools, police harassment, and limited work. The lengthy occupation of Alcatraz by student activists from San Francisco and the founding of the American Indian Movement (AIM) in 1968 in Minneapolis, Minnesota by mostly Ojibwe activists were examples of rising activism.  

To raise national awareness of issues related to Indian-federal relations, AIM and other organizations conceived a cross-country caravan to promote their cause. Protesters joined portions of the caravan in West Coast cities: Seattle, San Francisco, and Los Angeles, which they departed on October 6, by bus and auto. The three caravans merged in Minneapolis, Minnesota where leaders drafted a Twenty-Point proposal of demands. The caravan reached the nation's capital of Washington, D.C. in early November, the week before the presidential election (in which incumbent President Nixon was re-elected). The protesters had chosen this time period as best to present the next administration with "an agenda for action on Indian problems."  The large gathering of Native Americans in the US capital made national news as they advocated for their rights, and sought to meet with government officials to negotiate a new relationship.

The Nixon Administration refused  to meet with the protesters to receive the Twenty-Point Position paper. Protesters believed they had been double-crossed and occupied the Department of Interior headquarters building, where Bureau of Indian Affairs national offices were located. The Interior building was taken over by some 500 AIM members. During their occupation, some protesters destroyed records in protest and refused to leave the building until the government negotiated with them. The stand-off ended one week later. The federal government finally appointed a negotiator and agreed to appoint a Native American to a post within the BIA. In these talks the federal government made concessions to the protesters, including further treaty negotiations.

While the demonstration was widely covered by national media, including increasingly important television reporting, the media largely focused on issues related to the federal government, rather than what the protesters identified as failures of the government and their stressing tribal sovereignty as the basis for seeking new relations and negotiations. Having captured media attention, AIM organized additional demonstrations to advocate for Native American justice, such as the Wounded Knee Occupation protest beginning in February 1973.

Summary of the Twenty-Point Position Paper
The Twenty-Point Position Paper was drafted by rights activist Hank Adams a participant in the Trail of Broken Treaties. The paper was intended to assert the sovereignty of the Indian Nations and to re-open treaty negotiations.

The United States Federal Government should retract the component of the 1871 Indian Appropriations Act which eliminated the power of the Indian Nations to contract constitutionally bound treaties with the U.S. government.
The United States Federal Government should establish a Treaty Commission that will have the power to contract new treaties to ensure the future of the Indian Nations.  In addition, it should be established that no terms of existing treaties can be violated.
The Federal Government should pledge that they will meet with four American Indian representatives before June 2, 1974 in order to discuss the future of the Indian Nations.  The national media should be present for this meeting.
The President of the United States should establish a committee consisting of both Indians and non-Indians to examine treaty commitments and violations.
Treaties that have not been ratified should be presented to the Senate.
All American Indian peoples should be considered to be in treaty relations with the United States Federal Government.
The United States Federal Government should ensure that there is judicial enforcement and protection of the treaty rights of American Indians.
The United States Federal Government should provide a new system of federal court jurisdiction through which American Indians can address treaty or tribal rights.  This system of jurisdiction must apply both in cases between American Indians and between American Indians and non-Indians.  It is of utmost importance that leaders of the Indian Nations take part in the process of interpreting treaties.
The Congress of the United States should relinquish their control over Indian Affairs and instead create a joint committee.  This committee is to be called the "Committee on Reconstruction of Indian Relations and Programs".  The members of the committee must be willing to commit significant amounts of their time to restructure Indian relations in America.
This area should be perpetually non-taxable by the federal government. In addition the Termination Acts of the 1950s and 1960s should be immediately repealed.
There should be a revision of 25 U.S.C. 163.  This revision will call for all Indian rights to be restored to individuals that have lost them due to issues with enrollment.  In addition, American Indians must be able to qualify for membership in more than one tribe and not be prohibited from receiving dual benefits.
Congress must repeal state laws passed under the Public Law 280.  PL280 allows for people not belonging to the Indian community to gain control over governing in reservation areas.  The law takes away American Indians' ability to govern themselves without external conflict.
All violent offenses against Indians should be treated as federal crimes and the persons committing the crimes must face penalties under federal prosecution.  Congress should also create a national federal Indian grand jury.  This grand jury should consist only of Indians that are chosen by the President as well as by Indian people.  In addition this jury will have jurisdiction over non-Indian peoples living on Indian reservations.
The Bureau of Indian Affairs should be dismantled by 1976 and a new government structure that maintains Indian-Federal relations should be established.
The new structure that will replace the Bureau of Indian Affairs will be called the "Office of Federal Indian Relations and Community Reconstruction".
The "Office of Federal Indian Relations and Community Reconstruction" will promote equality between the Indian Nations and the federal government and seek to remedy the wrongdoings of the federal government against the American Indians.
Congress should enact a statute that allows for trade, commerce, and transportation of Indians to remain outside the jurisdiction of the federal government.  American Indians within reservation areas should have immunity from federal and state taxation.
The United States government should recognize and protect the spiritual and cultural integrity of the Indian Nations.
Forms of Indian organization should be consolidated so as to regain the unification of the Indian Nations.
The United States Federal Government should focus on the improvement and creation of better housing, education, employment and economic development for the American Indians.

Representation in other media
The documentary film Trudell, directed by Heather Rae, includes activist John Trudell discussing his part in the Trail Caravan, as well as the social context of the full action.

References

Further reading
Deloria, Vine Jr. (1974). Behind the Trail of Broken Treaties: An Indian Declaration of Independence. New York: Delacorte Press.

External links
Trail of Broken Treaties Caravan page
Jason Heppler, Framing Red Power: Newspapers, the Trail of Broken Treaties, and the Politics of Media, an Internet history project, 2009-2016, University of Nebraska-Lincoln, includes links to extensive primary sources, including media
30th Anniversary Memory, Indian Country Today, 2002

American Indian Movement
Protests in the United States
Native American history
Protest marches
Indigenous rights protests
1972 in the United States